Matthias Giraud also known as "Super Frenchie" ( born on September 24, 1983) is a professional skier and B.A.S.E. jumper. He was born in Évreux, France and grew up skiing at St Gervais-les-Bains/ Megeve, France. His first highly publicized accomplishment was the first ski B.A.S.E. jump off Mississippi Head on Mount Hood, Oregon. Matthias Giraud started as a competitive ski racer, but moved on to freeskiing and later on big mountain skiing. Matthias Giraud is known for combining BASE jumping with skiing and completed several first descents and ski BASE jumps across the globe including the first ski BASE jump off the Matterhorn in Switzerland. He is also known for escaping an avalanche off Aiguille Croche in Megeve, France while performing a ski BASE jump with his friend Stefan Laude. Matthias Giraud currently lives in Bend, Oregon.

Career accomplishments 

 2011: 
First person to ski BASE jump off the Matterhorn, Switzerland - First Wingsuit flight from the State of Washington, USA to the State of Oregon, USA
 2010: 
Ski BASE jump off the Eiger West wall into the North face, Switzerland; 
First ski BASE jump off Ingram Peak, Telluride, Colorado, USA
 2009: 
First Descent and ski BASE jump off Aiguille Croche, Megeve, France;
First person to ski BASE jump off Ajax Peak, Telluride, Colorado, USA
 2008: 
CNN Headline News - Video segment Voted “Best of Year”; 
First person to ski BASE jump off Mount Hood, Oregon, USA; 
First descent and ski BASE jump off Engineer Mountain South Face, Colorado, USA; 
First BASE jump while wearing a 360 camera with Miles Daisher.
 2007: 
Cover of SKI magazine; 
7th Stihl Colorado Freeride Series (Aspen, Colorado, USA);
Semi-finalist US Extreme Freeskiing Championships (Crested Butte, Colorado, USA); 
Forerunner US Freeskiing Open (Telluride, USA)

Publications and media coverage 

 CNN Headline News
 ABC - Good Morning America
 National Geographic TV
 Weather Channel
 Fox News
 ABC News
 NBC News
 Ski Magazine
 Skiing Magazine
 The Ski Journal
 Backcountry Magazine
 Skydiving Magazine
 Ski Canada
 Ski & Board (UK)
 Skipass.com
 SBC Skier
 ESPN Freesking
 WIDSIX TV

References 
 CNN Headline News - Best of the Year
 Good Morning America 2008
 Skier makes daring base jump off Mount Hood
 Special camera puts viewers in the adventure
 Skipass.com Aiguille Croche Video
 Man BASE jumps off Engineer
 Extreme Skier Jumps Off Cliff, Films Avalanche
 Smith Optics The Lounge
 Ski B.A.S.E. Jumper Matthias Giraud

External links 
 
 
 
 

1983 births
Living people
American male alpine skiers
French male skiers